The Höllental, English translation  "Hell Valley" or "Valley of Hell" is one of the routes on the German side leading up the Zugspitze on the German-Austrian border in the northern Alps. It is located in the district of Garmisch-Partenkirchen.

See also
Zugspitze
Höllental on the German Wikipedia

External links
 ZUGSPITZE 360°, atop the Zugspitze via the Höllental

Valleys of the Alps
Valleys of Bavaria
Canyons and gorges of Germany